Orthogonius saundersi is a species of ground beetle in the subfamily Orthogoniinae. It was described by Andrewes in 1926.

References

saundersi
Beetles described in 1926